Kori may refer to:

 Kori (woreda), a district in Afar Region, Ethiopia
 Kori, Central African Republic
 Kori, Bushehr, a village in Iran
 Koori, Fukushima, a town in Japan
 Koli people, an Indian ethnic group
 Kori caste, a weaving caste of India
 Kori or kouri, the Hausa language term for a wadi 
 Kori a Maori language term for movement (can be used as a verb or noun)
 Kōri, a possible Japanese reading of Goryeo, a dynasty in Korea
 Kori bustard (Ardeotis kori), a large bird native to Africa
 Kori Inkpen, Canadian computer scientist
 Kori Nuclear Power Plant, a nuclear power plant in South Korea
 Kori Turbowitz, character in the 2006 film Cars
 Kutch kori, currency from India, abolished in 1947
Starfire, or Koriand'r, DC Comics character, nicknamed "Kori"

See also
Cori (disambiguation)
Khori (disambiguation)
Kouri (disambiguation)
Kuri (disambiguation)